The following is a list of schools in Sabaragamuwa Province, Sri Lanka.

Kegalle District

National schools

Provincial schools

Private schools

International Schools

Special Schools

Ratnapura District

National schools

Provincial schools

Private Schools

International schools

Special Schools

References

 
Sabaragamuwa
Schools in Kegalle District
Schools in Ratnapura District